Yesipenko or Esipenko is a surname of Russian origin. People with that name include:

 Andrey Esipenko (born 2002), Russian chess grandmaster
 Rinat Yesipenko (born 1983), Russian footballer

See also
 
 

Russian-language surnames